Henry Moore Bates (March 30, 1869 – April 15, 1949) was an American lawyer. He was dean of the University of Michigan Law School for 29 years.

Born in Chicago, Bates received a Ph.B. from the University of Michigan in 1890 and a LL.B. from Northwestern University in 1892.  After practicing law at Chicago, 1892–1903, he became Tappan Professor of Law at the University of Michigan and was made dean of the Law School there in 1910.  In 1917–18 he was professor of law at the Harvard Law School and in 1921 he was appointed Commissioner of Uniform State Laws.  He was president of the Association of American Law Schools (1912–13), a member of the Executive Committee of the American Institute of Criminal Law (1911–14), and president of the Order of the Coif (1913–16). He was elected a Fellow of the American Academy of Arts and Sciences in 1938. Bates retired as dean in 1939.

References

External links
 Michigan Law Review memorial article, June 1949
 

1869 births
1949 deaths
Fellows of the American Academy of Arts and Sciences
Harvard Law School faculty
Northwestern University Pritzker School of Law alumni
Lawyers from Chicago
University of Michigan alumni
University of Michigan faculty